The 2014–15 Utah State Aggies women's basketball team represents Utah State University in the 2014–15 college basketball season. The Aggies, led by third year head coach Jerry Finkbeiner. The Aggies played their home games at the Smith Spectrum and were second year members of the Mountain West Conference. They finish the season 8–23, 5–13 in Mountain West play in a tie to finish in tenth place. They lost in the first round of the Mountain West women's tournament to San Jose State.

Roster

Schedule

|-
!colspan=9 style="background:#002654; color:#FFFFFF;"| Exhibition

|-
!colspan=9 style="background:#002654; color:#FFFFFF;"| Non-Conference Regular Season

|-
!colspan=9 style="background:#002654; color:#FFFFFF;"| Mountain West Regular Season

|-
!colspan=9 style="background:#002654; color:#FFFFFF;"|Mountain West Women's Tournament

See also
2014–15 Utah State Aggies men's basketball team

References 

Utah State
Utah State Aggies women's basketball seasons
Aggies
Aggies